Nazirpur is an upazila of Pirojpur District in the Division of Barisal, Bangladesh.

Geography
It has 31,862 households and a total area of 233.65 km2.

Demographics
According to the 1991 Bangladesh census, Nazirpur had a population of 166014. Males constituted 50.92% of the population, and females 49.08%. The population aged 18 or over was 86,581. Nazirpur had an average literacy rate of 43.4% (7+ years), compared to the national average of 32.4%.

Administration
Nazirpur Upazila is divided into nine union parishads: Daulbari Dobra, Dirgha, Kolardoania, Malikhali, Mativangga, Nazirpur, Shakhmatia, Shakharikathi, and Sriramkathi. The union parishads are subdivided into 68 mauzas and 171 villages.

Education
In the union council of Mativanga Baraibunia Secondary School, Baraibunia Girls School, union council of Malikhali here the Lara Secondary School and next to the 12 no. Jugia Govt. Primary School at Dighia, next to the village of Baithakata, there are the Baithakata College and the Mugarjhor High School.

 Sreeramkathi U.J.K High School
 Nazirpur College
Bangamata Fazilatunnisa Girls College 
AM Ideal Grammar School 
Qawmi Madrasha (Arabic school)

See also
Upazilas of Bangladesh
Districts of Bangladesh
Divisions of Bangladesh

References

Upazilas of Pirojpur District